Hamidullah Karimi (born February 6, 1992) is an Afghan footballer who currently plays as a forward for Indian club Delhi United S.C. He has been capped for the Afghanistan national football team.

Club career
Karimi joined Toofan Harirod F.C. in 2012. In the 2012 Afghan Premier League scored 9 goals in 5 games and was the league's top scorer and helped Toofan Harirod F.C. win the inaugural Afghan Premier League. In the 2013 Afghan Premier League Karimi could not lead Toofan Harirod F.C. to win another Afghan Premier League title as they were eliminated by Shaheen Asmayee F.C. in the semi finals. In Toofan Harirod F.C.'s final game of the season against Oqaban Hindukush F.C. he scored 2 goals to help his team win third place of the 2013 Afghan Premier League. He later went on to play for Meghe United in India, Sorkhposhan Herat and Delhi United.

International career
Karimi was called up for Afghanistan's squad in the 2014 AFC Challenge Cup Qualifiers but did not play in a single game. In the 2013 SAFF Championship, he was subbed in for Belal Arezou versus Maldives and had one chance that was saved after receiving a pass from Toofan Harirod teammate Maroof Mohammadi.

International goals

Honours

Toofan Harirod F.C.
 2012 Afghan Premier League

Afghanistan
 2013 SAFF Championship

Individual
 2012 Afghan Premier League Golden Boot
 2013 Afghan Premier League Golden Boot

References

Living people
Afghan footballers
1992 births
Sportspeople from Herat
Association football forwards
Afghanistan international footballers